Azat-Châtenet is a commune in the Creuse department in the Nouvelle-Aquitaine region in central France.

Geography

Population

Sights
 The church of St.Julien, dating from the fourteenth century.
 A fourteenth-century stone cross.

See also
Communes of the Creuse department

References

Communes of Creuse